Faylakan (also spelled Filkan/Filakan) was a Persian nobleman who served as the governor of the Sasanian province of Meshan. In 637, he was defeated and killed during the Arab invasion of Iran.

Sources 
 
 

Year of birth unknown
Generals of Yazdegerd III
637 deaths
Sasanian governors of Meshan
7th-century Iranian people